Qelichabad (also Romanized as Qelīchābād; also known as Ḩājj Qelīch Khān) is a village in Dorungar Rural District, Now Khandan District, Dargaz County, Razavi Khorasan Province, Iran. At the 2006 census, its population was 253, in 67 families.

References 

Populated places in Dargaz County